The "Calamus" poems are a cluster of poems in Leaves of Grass by Walt Whitman.  These poems celebrate and promote "the manly love of comrades". Most critics believe that these poems are Whitman's clearest expressions in print of his ideas about homoerotic male love.

Genesis and "Live Oak With Moss"
The first evidence of the poems that were to become the "Calamus" cluster is an unpublished manuscript sequence of twelve poems entitled "Live Oak With Moss," written in or before spring 1859. These poems were all incorporated in Whitman's 1860 edition of Leaves of Grass, but out of their original sequence.  These poems seem to recount the story of a relationship between the speaker of the poems and a male lover.  Even in Whitman's intimate writing style, these poems, read in their original sequence, seem unusually personal and candid in their disclosure of love and disappointment, and this manuscript has become central to arguments about Whitman's homoeroticism or homosexuality. This sequence was not known in its original manuscript order until a 1953 article by Fredson Bowers.

"Calamus" sequence
In the 1860 third edition of Leaves of Grass, Whitman included the twelve "Live Oak" poems along with others to form a sequence of 45 untitled numbered poems. This sequence as written celebrates many aspects of "comradeship" or "adhesive love," Whitman's term, borrowed from phrenology to describe male same-sex attraction. This attraction is presented in its political, spiritual, metaphysical, and personal phases—Whitman offering it as the backbone of future nations, the root of religious sentiments, the solution to the big questions of life, and as a source of personal anguish and joy.

The 1860 edition contains three poems that Whitman later edited out of the sequence, including the very personal Calamus 8, "Long I thought that knowledge alone would suffice me," and Calamus 9, "Hours continuing long, sore and heavy-hearted." Whitman's constant editing of his works meant that many of the other poems changed and shifted position in the editions that appeared during his lifetime. By the 1881–82 edition, the number of poems had been reduced to 39. Some critics contend that Whitman's edits tended to reduce some of his most personal and specific disclosures, possibly in an attempt to make the sequence more attractive to a wider audience. Others, such as Betsy Erkkila, note that Whitman retained some equally personal poems for the 1867 edition and view his editorial decisions as a function of Whitman building a particular national persona for himself.

The meaning of Calamus as a symbol

This cluster of poems contains a number of images and motifs that are repeated throughout, notably the Calamus root itself. Acorus calamus or Sweet Flag is a marsh-growing plant similar to a cat-tail. Whitman continues through this one of the central images of Leaves of Grass – Calamus is treated as a specific example of the grass that he writes of elsewhere. Some scholars have pointed out, as reasons for Whitman's choice, the phallic shape of what Whitman calls the "pink-tinged roots" of Calamus, its mythological association with male same-sex love, and the allegedly mind-altering effects of the root. The root was chiefly chewed at the time as a breath-freshener and to relieve stomach complaints.

References

External links

Calamus On WikiSource
 Manuscript for "Live Oak With Moss" at the Walt Whitman Archive

Calamus
Poetry by Walt Whitman
1860 poems
LGBT poetry
LGBT literature in the United States
Male homosexuality